NGC 4314 is a barred spiral galaxy approximately 53 million light-years away in the northern constellation of Coma Berenices. It is positioned around 3° to the north and slightly west of the star Gamma Comae Berenices and is visible in a small telescope. The galaxy was discovered by German-born astronomer William Herschel on March 13, 1785. It was labelled as peculiar by Allan Sandage in 1961 because of the unusual structure in the center of the bar. NGC 4314 is a member of the Coma I group of galaxies.

The morphological classification of this galaxy is SBa, which indicates a barred spiral galaxy (SB) with very tightly wound spiral arms (a). It is inclined at an angle of 21° to the line of sight from the Earth, and the primary bar is oriented with a position angle of 158°. The bar extends out to a diameter of  before joining the spiral arms. Outside the nuclear region, the galaxy is considered generally gas-poor, with no H II regions in the outer spiral arms.

Most of these clusters are 15 million years old or less. The current burst of galactic star formation is estimated to have lasted 30 million years. External to the ring, the stars are generally older than within the ring structure, suggesting a previous epoch of star formation.


See also
AINUR
NGC 1512

References

External links
 
 
 McDonald Observatory: 9 April 2002 News Release
 ESA/Hubble NGC 4314

Barred spiral galaxies
Coma I Group
Coma Berenices
4314
07443
40097